An outdoor cinema consists of a digital or analog movie projector, scaffolded construction or inflatable movie screen, and sound system.

History
Outdoor cinemas first began at around 1916 in Berlin, Germany. During the 1920s, many "rooftop theatres" converted to cinema use. One example of this was the Loew's New York, located on Times Square.

Viewers usually sit on camping chairs or blankets. Some Hollywood world premieres were screened in outdoor cinemas – sometimes with the stars in attendance. Most screenings are free with some raising money for charities.

As projector prices have decreased, guerrilla style outdoor cinemas have become more common.  These are run on a very small budget by groups of amateurs.  The events commonly are organised online; participants then meet in parks, empty parking lots, or other public places. Guerrilla outdoor cinemas are very basic, often needing to be completely set up and dismantled in a single night.  Sheets, portable screens, or existing walls are used as a screen for the projected image.  Power is obtained from generators or car batteries.

These kind of cinemas are very popular in Greece during the summer, with at least 90 operating in Athens, as of 2015. At its peak in the 1960s, the city hosted more than 600 outdoor cinemas.

Examples

Large and well-known outdoor cinemas include the Outdoor Cinema Food Fest in California, Oshkosh’s Fly-In theater, Screen on the Green (Atlanta) or Sunset Cinema in Australia. More and more often prestigious film festivals add outdoor movies to their regular screenings. Some of the most important outdoor movie events were the world premiere of Shark Tale on St. Mark’s Square at Venice Film Festival (2004) and outdoor at Dubai International Film Festival (2011).

Also, more private outdoor cinemas operate, sometimes as a part of a pool or backyard party. Unusual locations to show a movie outdoors include of skyscraper rooftops, screens floating on a lake with spectators sitting on boats, screenings where guests watch a movie in hot tubs or drive-in cinemas on the top floor of a parking garage. A special type of outdoor cinema is the drive-in theater.

In cold-weather climates, public film screenings have been projected onto surfaces of snow, in such countries as Finland and Canada.

See also
 List of drive-in theaters

References

Cinemas and movie theaters
Audiovisual introductions in 1916
Cinema